Second Old School Baptist Church of Roxbury is a historic Baptist church building on City Rd. 41 in Roxbury, Delaware County, New York. It is a 2-story, three-by-four-bay wood-frame building constructed in 1832–1833. The interior features a traditional meeting house plan. Also on the property is a small frame outhouse built about 1870, a three-step fieldstone carriage step, and cemetery.

It was added to the National Register of Historic Places in 1999.

See also
National Register of Historic Places listings in Delaware County, New York

References

Baptist churches in New York (state)
Churches on the National Register of Historic Places in New York (state)
National Register of Historic Places in Delaware County, New York
Federal architecture in New York (state)
Churches completed in 1832
19th-century Baptist churches in the United States
Churches in Delaware County, New York